Ahmet Reşit Rey (1870 – 1955) was an Ottoman liberal politician and government minister,  who served as Interior Minister twice in 1912-1913 and in 1920, serving his second term in the cabinet of Damat Ferid Pasha. He was the father of renowned composer Cemal Reşit Rey.

References 

1870 births
1955 deaths
People from Çankırı
20th-century Turkish politicians
Politicians of the Ottoman Empire
Government ministers of the Ottoman Empire